Psammophora saxicola is a species of plant in the family Aizoaceae. It is endemic to Namibia. It is threatened by habitat loss.

References

Flora of Namibia
Aizoaceae
Least concern plants
Taxonomy articles created by Polbot